The 1961 World Fencing Championships were held in Turin, Italy.

Medal table

Medal summary

Men's events

Women's events

References

FIE Results

World Fencing Championships
1961 in Italian sport
Sports competitions in Turin
International fencing competitions hosted by Italy
1961 in fencing
1960s in Turin